Chinga Chavin is the stage name of American musician and advertising executive Nathan Allen "Nick" Chavin. Chavin released the album Country Porn in 1976 on Attic Records.

Life and career
Nick "Chinga" Chavin was born in 1944. He achieved considerable notoriety when he recorded and released the raunchy comedy album Country Porn in 1976. It was sold through the mail by Penthouse magazine and sold over 100,000 units. Country Porn was reissued on CD in 1992 with liner notes, a booklet complete with song lyrics and photographs, and four bonus songs.

Track 2 of the album is a song Chavin wrote with friend Kinky Friedman, the comedic "Asshole from El Paso," a blithely vulgar parody of the country classic "Okie From Muskogee" by Merle Haggard. Friedman later recorded a much shorter and less rudely worded version of the song. Track 3 of the album, "Cum Stains on the Pillow", was covered in reworded form by David Allan Coe, on his 1978 album Nothing Sacred.

Chavin's other albums are Jet Lag and Live and Politically Erect. He contributed two songs to the soundtrack of the adults only mystery thriller Punk Rock. Chavin now runs an advertising agency in New York City.

Cultural impact and legacy
Country Porn holds a unique place in popular and country music history, but four decades later, in 2016, Wheeler Walker Jr. seems to have picked up the torch of satirical, sexually explicit, deliberately offensive country songs.

Selected discography
Country Porn (Attic – LAT 1094, 1976)
Talkin' Matamoros First Piece O' Ass Blues
Asshole From El Paso
Cum Stains On The Pillow (Where Your Sweet Head Used to Be)
Head Boogie
Sit, Sit, Sit (Sit On My Face)
Dry Humping In The Back Of A Fifty-Five Ford
Get It On The Run
Tit Stop Rock
4:00 A.M. Jump
Cum Unto Jesus (A Sacred Tune)
Bennies An' Beer
No Sell-Out Too Small
Jailbait
Scum Floats

(The last four songs were bonus tracks on the 1992 CD re-issue)

References

External links

American comedy musicians
American satirists
Living people
Year of birth missing (living people)